Frances Lumley-Saunderson, Countess of Scarbrough (c.1700 – 30 December 1772), formerly Frances Douglas-Hamilton, was a British courtier.

She was a younger daughter of George Hamilton, 1st Earl of Orkney, and his wife, the former Elizabeth Villiers. Her eldest sister, Anne, succeeded their father in the earldom.

On 27 June 1724, Frances married Thomas Lumley-Saunderson, 3rd Earl of Scarbrough, the third son of Richard Lumley, 1st Earl of Scarbrough and Frances Jones of Aston. They had five children:

 Richard, styled Viscount Lumley (1725–1782), later 4th Earl of Scarbrough
 George (d. 11 December 1739)
 Lady Anne (d. 1807)
 Lady Frances (d. 1796), married Peter Ludlow, 1st Earl Ludlow (1730–1803) in June 1753
 Lady Harriet (d. 6 November 1747)

Following her marriage, she was a Lady of the Bedchamber to Caroline, Princess of Wales (later Queen Caroline of Great Britain) and to Princess Augusta of Wales (from 1745).

As a Lady of the Bedchamber, the countess received a salary and was in a position of some influence. She remained friendly with Sarah Churchill, Duchess of Marlborough, at times when the latter was out of favour at court.

References

1772 deaths
Ladies of the Bedchamber
Year of birth unknown
English countesses
Year of birth uncertain
Household of Augusta of Saxe-Gotha
Daughters of Scottish earls